Common iliac vessels are composed of:

 The common iliac artery (arteria iliaca communis)
 The common iliac vein (vena iliaca communis)

Arteries of the abdomen